John Dias (born 4 August 1978) is an Indian footballer who plays as a defender for Air India FC in the I-League.

Career

Air India
Dias made his debut for Air India F.C. on 20 September 2012 during a Federation Cup match against Mohammedan at the Kanchenjunga Stadium in Siliguri, West Bengal in which he started the match; Air India lost the match 0–1.

Career statistics

Club
Statistics accurate as of 12 May 2013

References

External links
 
 goal.com

Living people
1978 births
Footballers from Goa
I-League players
Dempo SC players
Air India FC players
Association football defenders
Indian footballers